Alaena reticulata is a butterfly in the family Lycaenidae. It is found in southern Tanzania, Malawi and Zambia.

References

Butterflies described in 1896
Alaena
Butterflies of Africa
Taxa named by Arthur Gardiner Butler